Organ procurement (also called organ harvesting) is a surgical procedure that removes organs or tissues for reuse, typically for organ transplantation.

Procedures 
If the organ donor is human, most countries require that the donor be legally dead for consideration of organ transplantation (e.g. cardiac or brain dead). For some organs, a living donor can be the source of the organ. For example, living donors can donate one kidney or part of their liver to a well-matched recipient.

Organs cannot be procured after the heart has stopped beating for a long time. Thus, donation after brain death is generally preferred because the organs are still receiving blood from the donor's heart until minutes before being removed from the body and placed on ice. In order to better standardize the evaluation of brain death, The American Academy of Neurology (AAN) published a new set of guidelines in 2010. These guidelines require that three clinical criteria be met in order to establish brain death: coma with a known cause, absence of brain stem reflexes, and apnea.

Donation after cardiac death (DCD) involves surgeons taking organs within minutes of the cessation of respirators and other forms of life support for patients who still have at least some brain activity. This occurs in situations where, based on the patient's advanced directive or the family's wishes, the patient is going to be withdrawn from life support. After this decision has been made, the family is contacted for consideration for organ donation. Once life support has been withdrawn, there is a 2-5 minute waiting period to ensure that the potential donor's heart does not start beating again spontaneously. After this waiting period, the organ procurement surgery begins as quickly as possible to minimize time that the organs are not being perfused with blood. DCD had been the norm for organ donors until 'brain death' became a legal definition in the United States in 1981. Since then, most donors have been brain-dead.

If consent is obtained from the potential donor or the potential donor's survivors, the next step is to perform a match between the source (donor) and the target (recipient) to reduce rejection of the organ by the recipient's immune system. In the United States, the match between human donors and recipients is coordinated by groups like United Network for Organ Sharing.

Co-ordination between teams working on different organs is often necessary in case of multiple-organ procurement. Multiple-organ procurement models are also developed from slaughtered pigs to reduce the use of laboratory animals.

The quality of the organ then is certified. If the heart stopped beating for too long then the organ becomes unusable and cannot be used for transplant.

Preservation and transport
After organ procurement the organs are often rushed to the site of the recipient for transplantation or preserved for later study. The faster the organ is transplanted into the recipient, the better the outcome. While the organ is being transported, it is either stored in an icy cold solution to help preserve it or it is connected to a miniature organ perfusion system which pumps an icy solution (sometimes enriched with potassium) through the organ. This time during transport is called the "cold ischemia time". Heart and lungs should have less than 6 hours between organ procurement and transplantation. For liver transplants, the cold ischemia time can be up to 24 hours, although typically surgeons aim for a much shorter period of time. For kidney transplants, as the cold ischemia time increases, the risk of delayed function of the kidney increases. Sometimes, the kidney function is delayed enough that the recipient requires temporary dialysis until the transplanted kidney begins to function.

In recent years novel methods of organ preservation have emerged that may be able to improve the quality of donated organs or assess their viability. In the case of DCD, the first technique established for organ procurement was super-rapid recovery. The most widely used technique involves machine perfusion of the organ at either hypothermic (4-10 °C) or normothermic (37 °C) temperatures. Hypothermic perfusion of kidneys is a relatively widespread practice. For the heart normothermic preservation has been used in which the heart is provided with warm oxygenated blood and so continues to beat ex-vivo during its preservation. This technique has also been applied to lungs and led to the emergence of donor lung reconditioning centres in North America. For the liver, hypothermic and normothermic techniques are being used with evidence to suggest that both may be beneficial.

There is ongoing research and development to improve machine perfusion and alternative approaches such as novel cryoprotectant solvents to improve organ viability and availability – such as by increasing preservation durations.

Ethical issues

According to the World Health Organization (WHO), illegal organ trade occurs when organs are removed from the body for the purpose of commercial transactions.  Despite ordinances against organ sales, this practice persists, with studies estimating that anywhere from 5% to 42% of transplanted organs are illicitly purchased.  Research indicates that illegal organ trade is on the rise, with a recent report by Global Financial Integrity estimating that the illegal organ trade generates profits between $600 million and $1.2 billion per year, with a span over many countries.  These countries include, but are not limited to:
 Angola
 Brazil
 Canada
 China
 Colombia
 Costa Rica
 Eastern Europe
 Ecuador
 Georgia
 Haiti
 Israel
 Kosovo
 Libya
 Mexico
 North Macedonia
 Pakistan
 Peru
 Philippines
 Russia
 South Africa
 The United Kingdom
 The United States of America

Although the procedure of organ transplantation has become widely accepted, there are still a number of ethical debates around related issues. The debates center around illegal, forced or compensated transplantation like organ theft or organ trade, fair organ distribution, and to a lesser degree, animal rights and religious prohibition on consuming some animals such as pork.

There is a shortage of organs available for donation with many patients waiting on the transplant list for a donation match. About 20 patients die each day waiting for an organ on the transplant list. When an organ donor does arise, the transplant governing bodies must determine who receives the organ. The UNOS computer matching system finds a match for the organ based on a number of factors including blood type and other immune factors, size of the organ, medical urgency of the recipient, distance between donor and recipient, and time the recipient has been waiting on the waitlist.

Because of the significant need for organs for transplantation, there is ethical debate around where the organs can be obtained from and whether some organs are obtained illegally or through coercion.

In 2009, the Swedish tabloid Aftonbladet triggered international controversy by claiming that Israeli troops killed Palestinians in order to harvest their organs – the Israeli government condemned the allegations as an antisemitic libel. During the controversy, it emerged that there had been a practice in Israel of harvesting tissues from the deceased (both Israelis, Palestinians, and foreigners) without the knowledge and consent of their families, but that practice ended in the 1990s.

China

In 2005, China admitted to using the organs of executed prisoners for transplant. Due to religious tradition of many Chinese people who value leaving the body whole after death, the availability of organs for transplant is much more limited. Almost all the organs transplanted from deceased donors came from executed prisoners. Since then, China has repeatedly been found to have a rampant black market for organs for transplant, including continued use of organs from executed prisoners without their consent and targeting young army conscripts for their organs. In 2014, China promised that by January 1, 2015, only voluntary organ donors would be accepted. China has worked to increase the number of voluntary organ donors as well as to convince the international community that they have changed their organ procurement practices after many prior failed attempts to do so. According to the former vice-minister of health, Dr. Huang Jiefu, the number of voluntary organ transplants increased by 50% from 2015 to 2016. Many of the organs harvested are sold to overseas buyers who fly to China for the transplantation procedure. It is possible to schedule these surgeries in advance which is not possible in systems which rely on voluntary organ donation. In the year 2020, allegations were made that Muslim customers from the Middle East, including Saudi Arabia, reportedly request Halal organs, those which come from a Muslim person from Xinjiang.

India 
Before 1994, India had no legislation banning the sale of organs.  Low costs and high availability brought in business from around the globe, and transformed India into one of the largest kidney transplant centers in the world. However, several problems began to surface.  Patients were often promised payments that were much higher than what they actually received.  Other patients reported that their kidneys were removed without their consent after they underwent procedures for other reasons.

In 1994, the country passed the Transplantation of Human Organs Act (THOA), banning commerce in organs and promoting posthumous donation of organs.  The law's primary mechanism for preventing the sale of organs was to restrict who could donate a kidney to another person.  In particular, the THOA bars strangers from donating to one another; a person can only donate to a relative, spouse, or someone bound by "affection."  In practice, though, people evade the law's restrictions to continue the trade in organs.  Often, claims of "affection" are unfounded and the organ donor has no connection to the recipient. In many cases, the donor may not be Indian or even speak the same language as the recipient.  There have also been reports of the donor marrying the recipient to circumvent THOA's prohibition.

Israel 

The Aftonbladet–Israel controversy refers to the controversy that followed the publication of a 17 August 2009 article in the Swedish tabloid Aftonbladet, one of the largest daily newspapers in the Nordic countries. The article alleged that Israeli troops harvested organs from Palestinians who had died in their custody. Sparking a fierce debate in Sweden and abroad, the article created a rift between the Swedish and the Israeli governments. Israeli officials denounced the report at the time and labelled it anti-Semitic. Written by Swedish freelance photojournalist Donald Boström, the article's title was Våra söner plundras på sina organ ("Our sons are being plundered for their organs"). It presented allegations that in the late 1980s and the early 1990s, many young men from the West Bank and Gaza Strip had been seized by Israeli forces and their bodies returned to their families with organs missing.

The Israeli government and several US representatives condemned the article as baseless and incendiary, noted the history of antisemitism and blood libels against Jews and asked the Swedish government to denounce the article. The government refused, citing freedom of the press and the Swedish constitution. Swedish ambassador to Israel Elisabet Borsiin Bonnier condemned the article as "shocking and appalling" and stated that freedom of the press carries responsibility, but the Swedish government distanced itself from her remarks. The Swedish Newspaper Publishers' Association and Reporters Without Borders supported Sweden's refusal to condemn it. The former warned of venturing onto a slope with government officials damning occurrences in Swedish media, which may curb warranted debate and restrain freedom of expression by self-censorship. Italy made a stillborn attempt to defuse the diplomatic situation by a European resolution condemning antisemitism. The Palestinian National Authority announced that it would establish a commission to investigate the article's claims. A survey among the cultural editors of the other major Swedish newspapers found that all would have refused the article.

In December 2009, a 2000 interview with the chief pathologist at the L. Greenberg National Institute of Forensic Medicine Yehuda Hiss was released in which he had admitted taking organs from the corpses of Israeli soldiers, Israeli citizens, Palestinians and foreign workers without their families' permission. Israeli health officials confirmed Hiss's confession but stated that such incidents had ended in the 1990s and noted that Hiss had been removed from his post.

The Palestinian press claimed the report "appeared to confirm Palestinians' allegations that Israel returned their relatives' bodies with their chests sewn up, having harvested their organs".

Several news agencies reported that the Aftonbladet article had claimed that Israel killed Palestinians to harvest their organs, although the author, the culture editor for Aftonbladet, and Nancy Scheper-Hughes denied that it had made that claim.

The Philippines 
Although the sale of organs was not legal in the Philippines, prior to 2008 the practice was tolerated and even endorsed by the government.  The Philippine Information Agency, a branch of the government, even promoted "all-inclusive" kidney transplant packages that retailed for roughly $25,000.  The donors themselves often received as little as $2,000 for their kidneys. The country was a popular destination for transplant tourism.  One high-ranking government official estimated that 800 kidneys were sold annually in the country prior to 2008, and the WHO listed it as one of the top 5 sites for transplant tourists in 2005.

In March 2008, the government passed new legislation enforcing a ban on organ sales. After the crackdown on the practice, the number of transplants has decreased from 1,046 in 2007 to 511 in 2010. Since then, the government has taken a much more active stance against transplant tourism.

In the United States 
In the United States, organ procurement is heavily regulated by United Network for Organ Sharing (UNOS) to prevent unethical allocation of organs. There are over 110,000 patients on the national waiting list for organ transplantation and in 2016, only about 33,000 organ transplants were performed. Due to the lack of organ availability, about 20 patients die each day on the waiting list for organs. Organ transplantation and allocation is mired in ethical debate because of this limited availability of organs for transplant. In the United States in 2016, there were 19,057 kidney transplants, 7,841 liver transplants, 3,191 heart transplants, and 2,327 lung transplants performed.

Regulation 
Organ procurement is tightly regulated by United Network for Organ Sharing (UNOS). In the United States, there are a total of 58 Organ Procurement Organizations (OPOs) that are responsible for evaluating the candidacy of deceased donors for organ donation as well as coordinating the procurement of the organs. Each OPO is responsible for a particular geographic region and is under the regulation of the Organ Procurement and Transplantation Network.

Geographic Transplant Regions 
The United States is divided into 11 geographic regions by the Organ Procurement and Transplantation Network. Between these regions, there are significant differences in wait time for patients on the organ transplant list. This is of particular concern for liver transplant patients because transplantation is the only cure to end-stage liver disease and without a transplant, these patients will die. One example that brought this disparity to light was in 2009, when Steve Jobs traveled from California, where wait times are known to be very long, to Tennessee, where wait times are much shorter, to increase his chances of getting a liver transplant. In 2009, when Jobs received his liver transplant, the average wait time for liver transplantation in the United States for a patient with a MELD score of 38 (a metric of severity of liver disease) was about 1 year. In some regions, the wait time was as short as 4 months, while in others, it was more than 3 years. This variation for a patient with the same illness severity has caused significant controversy over how organs are distributed.

HOPE Act 
The HOPE (HIV Organ Policy Equity) Act allows for clinical research on organ transplantation from HIV+ donors to HIV+ recipients. The Act was passed by Congress in 2013 and officially changed OPTN policy to allow for its implementation in November, 2015. Prior to the HOPE Act, it was banned to acquire organs from any potential donor who was known to have, or even suspected to have, HIV. According to UNOS, in the first year of implementation, 19 organs were transplanted under the HOPE Act. Thirteen of those organs transplanted were kidneys and 6 were livers.

See also

References 

Organ transplantation